Ruben Hernandez (born November 21, 1950 in Panama City, Panama) is a retired Thoroughbred racing jockey best known for winning the 1979 Belmont Stakes aboard Coastal in which he defeated that year's Kentucky Derby and Preakness Stakes winner Spectacular Bid thereby denying him the coveted U.S. Triple Crown.

Racing career

The start
Ruben Hernandez began riding Thoroughbreds in his native Panama at the Hipódromo Presidente Remón in Panama City where he would win 1,412 races before emigrating to the United States. There, he would initially race at tracks in Florida, getting his first significant win at Hialeah Park in the April 3, 1974 Palm Beach Handicap, a race he would win again in 1975.

George Steinbrenner and a jockey's initiative
Overall, Ruben Hernandez enjoyed some success during his first four years racing in the United States. However, a game-changing win came in 1977 through a belief in himself that he could compete with the very best and he paid out of his own pocket the costs to travel from Florida to California with a purpose. There, he approached John Fulton, trainer for the Kinsman Stable owned by the notoriously hard-hearted owner of the New York Yankees baseball team, George Steinbrenner, and asked to ride their colt in the prestigious Grade 1 Santa Anita Derby to be run March 27. The admiration the action of Fernandez engendered from Steinbrenner was reported by The Washington Post, quoting him as saying "how many kids would do that, pay their own money to go from Florida to the Coast on a chance he could get work?" and adding, "I've got to stick with that kind of boy." Fernandez finished a very credible third on Steinbrenner's longshot colt Steve's Friend which paid bettors $16 to show.

On April 17, Ruben Hernandez and Steve's Friend gave Steinbrenner his biggest victory in racing when they won the Grade 1 Hollywood Derby. Sent off as a 34-1 longshot, Hernandez guided Steve's Friend to a  3/4 length come-from-behind victory over Affiliate and 3 1/2 lengths ahead of third-place finisher Habitony who had won the Santa Anita Derby. Steve's Friend won in a stakes record time of 1:47 4-5 for the 1-1/8 miles on dirt.

Returning East, Steve's Friend with Hernandez in the saddle again, ran fifth in the 1977 Kentucky Derby in what would be Seattle Slew's 1977 U.S. Triple Crown year.

The following year Ruben Hernandez rode from a base in New York state where he won numerous top level stakes. He ended 1978 with 172 wins from 992 starts for a 17% winning rate. He also traveled to Puerto Rico to ride and win with the Mexican horse Ezgarta in the Clásico Internacional del Caribe. A prestigious annual race for three-year-old horses hosted by one of the various Caribbean racetracks, the December 10, 1978 Clásico was run at Hippodromo El Nuevo Comandante.

Winning the Belmont
In 1979, three-year-old Coastal did not run in the Kentucky Derby and Preakness Stakes having only made his first start in late April as a result of a serious eye injury which had cut short his racing at age two. Prior to entering the 1-1/2 mile Belmont Stakes, Coastal had raced only three times that year. He won all three under Ruben Hernandez but at short distances of six then seven furlongs followed by the Peter Pan Stakes at a 1-1/8 miles. At the 1-1/4 mile point in the Belmont, Spectacular Bid was leading the eight-horse field by three lengths over Kentucky Derby runner-up General Assembly who was followed by the Louisiana and Arkansas Derby winner and Preakness runner-up, Golden Act. Coastal was sitting in fourth place and made his move, passing those three horses to take the lead at the top of the stretch. At the end, Coastal won by 3-1/4 lengths over Golden Act with Spectacular Bid third. 

For 1979, Hernandez would earn what would be a career-high 209 wins from 1,129 starts for a winning rate of 19%.

A very capable rider 
In a 1981 Washington Post story by Andrew Beyer about Noble Nashua winning the prestigious Marlboro Cup, the widely respected writer and developer of the Beyer Speed Figure wrote that winning jockey Ruben Hernandez had "made some of the best riders in America look like woeful incompetents."

During his career Hernandez won riding titles on racetracks in New York state and Florida.

Ruben Hernandez rode for the last time on November 22, 1997 at Calder Race Course in Miami Gardens, Florida.

References

1950 births
Living people
Panamanian jockeys
American jockeys
People from Panama City
Sportspeople from Panama City
Panamanian emigrants to the United States